The year 2014 saw a number of events in the video game industry.  No new major consoles were released, but updates and upgrades were: the New Nintendo 3DS was released in Japan and Oceania, and Sony released new model 2000 PS Vita systems in Europe & North America.  In video game-related corporate acquisitions, Amazon purchased the online video game streaming service Twitch, and Facebook acquired the virtual reality company and product Oculus.  Nintendo released Amiibo in 2014, companion figurines that could be scanned by the 3DS and Wii U systems.  On Twitter and other Internet social media, the Gamergate controversy began.

Among video games originally released in 2014, critics gave the highest reviews to Super Smash Bros. for Wii U, Dark Souls II, Bayonetta 2, Shovel Knight, Velocity 2X, Dragon Age: Inquisition,  Mario Kart 8, and Hearthstone: Heroes of Warcraft.  Other significant games that won awards included Destiny, Middle-earth: Shadow of Mordor, and Monument Valley.

Top-rated games

Major awards

Critically acclaimed titles
Metacritic (MC) and GameRankings (GR) are aggregators of video game journalism reviews.

Highest-grossing games
The following were 2014's top ten highest-grossing video games in terms of worldwide revenue (including physical sales, digital purchases, subscriptions, microtransactions, free-to-play and pay-to-play) across all platforms (including mobile, personal computer, and console platforms).

{| class="wikitable sortable" style="text-align:center"
|-
! 
! Game
! Revenue
! Publisher(s)
! Genre(s)
! Platform(s)
! Business model
! class="unsortable" | 
|-
| 1
| Puzzle & Dragons
| $1,500,000,000
| GungHo Online Entertainment 
| Puzzle
| Mobile
| Free-to-play
| 
|-
| 2
| Crossfire
| $1,400,000,000
| Smilegate / Tencent
| First-person shooter
| Windows
| Free-to-play
| 
|-
| 3
| Candy Crush Saga
| $1,330,000,000
| King Digital
| Puzzle
| Mobile
| Free-to-play
| 
|-
| 4
| Clash of Clans
| $1,000,000,000
| Supercell 
| Strategy
| Mobile
| Free-to-play
| 
|-
| 5
| League of Legends
| $946,000,000
| Riot Games / Tencent
| MOBA
| PC
| rowspan="2" | Free-to-play
| rowspan="2" | 
|-
| 6
| Dungeon Fighter Online
| $891,000,000
| Neople / Nexon
| Beat 'em up
| Windows
|-
| 7
| Call of Duty: Advanced Warfare
| $840,000,000
| Activision 
| First-person shooter
| Multi-platform
| Buy-to-play
| 
|-
| 8
| Grand Theft Auto V
| 
| Rockstar Games 
| Action-adventure
| Multi-platform
| Buy-to-play
| 
|-
| 9
| World of Warcraft
| $728,000,000
| Blizzard Entertainment 
| MMORPG
| PC
| Subscription
| 
|-
| 10
| Destiny
| $500,000,000
| Activision 
| First-person shooter
| Multi-platform
| Buy-to-play
|

Events
{| class="wikitable"
|-
! Month
! Date(s)
! Event
|-
| rowspan="5" style="text-align:center"|January
| unknown
|style="text-align:left;"|Atari emerges from Bankruptcy and plans to enter the Social Casino market.
|-
| 6
|style="text-align:left;"|2K Games discontinued the MLB 2K series.
|-
| 7
|style="text-align:left;"|PlayStation Now, a cloud-streaming from Sony Computer Entertainment was announced.
|-
| 15 - 16
| style="text-align:left;"| Steam Dev Days held in Seattle, Washington.
|-
| 27
| style="text-align:left;"| Microsoft acquired the Gears of War franchise from Epic Games.
|-
| rowspan="2" style="text-align:center"|February
| 5
| Double Helix Games was acquired by Amazon.com
|-
| 18
| style="text-align:left;"| Irrational Games, the creator of the BioShock series was shut down.
|-
| rowspan="5" style="text-align:center"| March
| 12
| style="text-align:left;"| 10th British Academy Video Games Awards held in Tobacco Dock, London.
|-
|17 – 21
| style="text-align:left;"| Game Developers Conference 2014 held in San Francisco, California.
|-
| 18
| Project Morpheus, a virtual reality initiative from Sony Computer Entertainment for the PlayStation 4 is announced.
|-
| 25
| style="text-align:left;"| Oculus VR was acquired by Facebook for $2 billion.
|-
|28 – 30
| style="text-align:left;"| Rezzed 2014 held at the NEC Birmingham.
|-
| rowspan="2" style="text-align:center"| April
| 11 – 13
| style="text-align:left;"| PAX East 2014 held at the Boston Convention and Exhibition Center.
|-
| 12 – 13
| style="text-align:left;"| Midwest Gaming Classic 2014 held at the Sheraton Milwaukee Brookfield Hotel in Brookfield, Wisconsin.
|-
| rowspan="2" style="text-align:center"|May
| 20
| style="text-align:left;"| Nintendo discontinues the Nintendo Wi-Fi Connection servers for Wii and Nintendo DS games.
|-
| 29
| Electronic Arts shut down Mythic Entertainment
|-
| rowspan="7" style="text-align:center"|June
|5
|Nintendo announces that their president, Satoru Iwata won't attend E3 due to medical issues.
|-
| 10 – 12
| style="text-align:left;" | E3 2014 held at the Los Angeles Convention Center.
|-
| 12
| style="text-align:left;" | Nordic Games acquired the publishing label of THQ.
|-
|14 – 17
| style="text-align:left;" | DreamHack-Summer held in Jönköping, Sweden.
|-
|rowspan="3"|30
| Crytek's IP's Homefront: The Revolution was acquired by Koch Media. Crytek UK, formerly Free Radical Design, and Crytek USA was shut down.
|-
| Deep Silver set up a new subsidiary known as Deep Silver Dambuster.
|-
| Electronic Arts shut down more than 50 multiplayer games.
|-
| rowspan="4" style="text-align:center"|July
|10
| Tony Hawk's Pro Skater'''s creator Neversoft was merged into Infinity Ward by Activision.
|-
| 17 – 20
|style="text-align:left;" | QuakeCon 2014: The massive annual LAN party held in Dallas, Texas.
|-
| 24 – 27
| style="text-align:left;"| SDCC 2014 held at the San Diego Convention Center.
|-
| Unknown
| style="text-align:left;"| Airtight Games was shut down approximately one month after the release of Murdered: Soul Suspect.
|-
| rowspan="8" style="text-align:center"|August
|7
| style="text-align:left;"| Activision revived the brand of Sierra Entertainment.
|-
|11
| style="text-align:left;"| Electronic Arts launched a subscription video game service called EA Access for the Xbox One.
|-
| 13 – 17
| style="text-align:left;"| Gamescom 2014 held in Cologne, Germany.
|-
| 20 – 22
| style="text-align:left;"| Unite 2014 held in Seattle, Washington.
|-
|25
| Twitch was acquired by Amazon.com for $970 million.
|-
|28
| The Gamergate controversy came to public attention due to the introduction of the GamerGate hashtag.
|-
| 29
| style="text-align:left;"|Nintendo announced the New Nintendo 3DS XL.
|-
| 29 – September 1
| style="text-align:left;"| PAX Prime 2014 held at the Washington State Convention Center.
|-
| rowspan="3" style="text-align:center"|September
|18 – 21
| style="text-align:left;"| Tokyo Game Show 2014 at the Makuhari Messe in Tokyo.
|-
| 25 – 28
| style="text-align:left;"| EGX London 2014 held in Earls Court, London.
|-
| 27
| Naughty Dog celebrated its 30th anniversary.
|-
| rowspan="8" style="text-align:center"|October
| 2 – 5
| style="text-align:left;"| GIGACON 2014 held in Telenor Arena, Oslo, Norway.
|-
| 3 – 5
| style="text-align:left;"| EGS 2014 held in Centro Banamex, Mexico City, Mexico.
|-
|6
| Ubisoft Reflections, formerly known as Reflections Interactive, celebrated its 30th anniversary.
|-
|11 – 12
| style="text-align:left;"| Play Expo 2014 held at EventCity, Manchester.
|-
| 11 – 12
| style="text-align:left;"| FirstLook 2014 held at Jaarbeurs in Utrecht, the Netherlands.
|-
| 19
| style="text-align:left;"| 2014 League of Legends World Championship was held at the Seoul World Cup Stadium
|-
| 24
| style="text-align:left;"| 32nd Golden Joystick Awards was held
|-
| 24 - 26
| style="text-align:left;"| Milan Games Week held at Fieramilanocity in Milan, Italy.
|-
| rowspan="5" style="text-align:center"|November
| 31 – 2
| style="text-align:left;" | PAX Australia 2014 held at the Melbourne Exhibition Centre in Melbourne, Australia.
|-
| 6
| Microsoft Studios acquired Minecraft developer Mojang for $2.5 billion.
|-
| 7 – 8
| style="text-align:left;" | BlizzCon 2014 held at the Anaheim Convention Center in Anaheim, California.
|-
| 12 - 17
| style="text-align:left;" | E-Sports World Championship 2014 was held in Baku, Azerbaijan
|-
| 27 – 30
| style="text-align:left;" | DreamHack-Winter held in Jönköping, Sweden.
|-
| rowspan="5" style="text-align:center"|December
|-
| 4
| 2K Games announced a new subsidiary called Hangar 13.
|-
| 5
| The Game Awards 2014 held in Las Vegas.
|-
| 6
| Ralph H. Baer, credited as the creator of the Magnavox Odyssey, died at the age of 92.
|-
| 6 – 7
| style="text-align:left;" | PlayStation Experience held at The Venetian Las Vegas in Las Vegas, Nevada.
|}

Notable deaths

 December 22 – Christine Cavanaugh, 51, voice actor best known for the voice of Chuckie in the "Rugrats" franchise.

Series with new entries
Series with new installments in 2014 include Assassin's Creed, Bayonetta, Borderlands, Call of Duty, Castlevania, Civilization, Dark Souls, Divinity,  Donkey Kong, Dragon Age, The Elder Scrolls, Elite,  Far Cry, Final Fantasy, Forza Horizon, Infamous, Kinect Sports, Kirby, LittleBigPlanet, Mario Golf, Mario Kart, Metal Gear, MX vs. ATV, Ninja Gaiden, Persona, Pokémon,  Professor Layton, Shantae, Sniper Elite, Sonic the Hedgehog, Strider Hiryu, Super Smash Bros., Tales, The Sims, Thief, Trials, Tropico, Wolfenstein, and World of Warcraft.

In addition, 2014 saw the introduction of several new properties, including Destiny,  Five Nights at Freddy's, Sunset Overdrive, Titanfall, The Evil Within and Watch Dogs''.

Game releases
The list of games released in 2014 in North America.

January–March

April–June

July–September

October–December

Video game-based film and television releases

See also
2014 in games

Notes

References

 
Video games by year